Rocky Prairie is a prairie that is about  southwest of Seattle, Washington, United States, and about  south of Washington's capital city of Olympia. It sits very close to the Millersylvania State Park, the community of Maytown, and the city of Tenino.

Old Highway 99 runs through Rocky Prairie. The part of the prairie west of the highway is called West Rocky Prairie. Both the west and east sides of the prairie have various plant and animal species. Many of the plant species are flowering plants. Both sides also have areas of Mima mounds (not to be confused with the Mima mounds at Mima Mounds Natural Area Preserve about 10.5 kilometers or 6.5 miles to the west).

Rocky Prairie is divided into several different properties. The two land owners west of Old Highway 99 are the Washington State Department of Fish and Wildlife and the Port of Tacoma. A major land owner east of Old Highway 99 is the Washington State Department of Natural Resources. There is also another property on the east side owned by Thurston County which has a gravel pit located on it. Some of the prairie on the east side is private property, and has pastures and houses on it.

In West Rocky Prairie, the property that belongs to the Washington State Department of Fish and Wildlife is called the West Rocky Prairie Wildlife Area. Part of the property is wooded, and part of it is in the prairie.

Plant species

Animal species

Climate
The closest weather station to Rocky Prairie with a long period of record collection is at the Olympia Regional Airport in Tumwater, a suburb of Olympia. Under the Köppen climate classification system, the climate of the Olympia area is classified as Csb. The C means that it is a temperate climate, meaning that the winters are chilly to mild. The s means that it is a Mediterranean climate, meaning that the summers are dry. The b means that the summers are warm but not hot. This type of climate is also called a warm-summer Mediterranean climate. In this type of climate, the winters are rainy. The area south of Olympia is in hardiness zone 8A.

Early history

Rocky Prairie and the other local prairies were formed around 17,000 BP (before present) during the Vashon Glaciation. The Vashon Glaciation was the time period in which the Cordilleran Ice Sheet extended south of the present-day US–Canadian border into Western Washington. The Vashon Glaciation was part of the Fraser Glaciation (the ice that had pushed through the Fraser River basin in British Columbia). This occurred during the Wisconsin Glaciation, the time period when ice sheets covered much of Canada and the northern United States. The Wisconsin Glaciation occurred during the last glacial period, a time when the Earth was more glaciated. This was the most recent glaciation of the Pleistocene Ice Age (the current ice age). The Pleistocene Ice Age is part of an even longer ice age called the Late Cenozoic Ice Age, which began 33.9 million BP with the formation of the Antarctic Ice Cap and continues to present day.

During the Vashon Glaciation, the Cordilleran Ice Sheet covered parts of Alaska and Canada. The portion that extended south of the Canadian border is called the Puget Lobe. Rocky Prairie was almost at the edge of where the glacier stopped, and was only under ice for a short period of time.

Pollen data collected from Battleground Lake (a lake about to the southeast of Rocky Prairie) show that from 20,000 - 16,000 BP, annual temperatures in the area were about 6 ± 1 °C (10.8 ± 1.8 °F) colder than in present times (present times as of 1990). Annual precipitation was around  less, meaning that precipitation was only about 24.5% of what it is in present times (present times as of 1990).

As the glaciers melted, they left behind sand and gravel. The sand and gravel drains water making the soils dry, particularly in the summer. Many of the plants that grew on these prairies were used as food or medicine by the early inhabitants. With the eventual encroachment of forest, the early inhabitants had to burn the prairies in order to maintain them. The practice went on for millennia, and is still continued today by conservation organizations. In current times, burning is also a way of controlling invasive non-native species.

Recent history
With the arrival of European settlers in the mid-1800s, new immigrants introduced plant species from where they came from so they could feel more at home. Many of these plants reproduced quickly, took over, and began replacing native species. A very problematic species on prairie lands in Thurston County is Cytisus scoparius (Scotch broom). Non-native grasses have also been a problem. Most of the grass on the prairies is non-native.

Thurston County has seen explosive growth since the 1970s, and the trend is expected to continue for the foreseeable future. Between 1970 and 2010, the population density of Thurston County grew from just 41.1 persons/km2 (106.5 persons/mi2) to 134.9 persons/km2 (349.4 persons/mi2). The average rate of growth during those years was 2.3 person/km2 (6.1 persons/mi2) per year, which is 4.3 times the global average on land.

The explosive growth is causing prairie and other natural lands to quickly shrink.

Proposed development

The Port of Tacoma owns a property on West Rocky Prairie that borders on the West Rocky Prairie Unit (the state owned property).

On July 17, 2006, the Port of Olympia and the Port of Tacoma made an agreement to build a railway logistics center.  The next day, the Port of Tacoma purchased the property at Rocky Prairie from Citifor, Inc. for a price of over US$21 million (about $70,000 per hectare or $28,000 per acre).  Later that year, local groups got together to block the proposal.

In 2008, there were several meetings with the public in which the Thurston County commissioners and representatives from the ports were present. Many citizens had the opportunity to speak in front of the public and voice their opinion about the proposal. Almost everyone that spoke was opposed to the proposal. On June 30, 2008, the Port of Tacoma and the Port of Olympia dropped the proposal to put in the logistics center.

The Port of Tacoma decided to sell the property.  In April 2010, a developer from southern California made a down payment on the property.  They formed a company called Maytown Sand and Gravel, LLC.  After about a year, the property went back to the Port of Tacoma.  The company had defaulted on their loan.

In 2019, the Port of Tacoma is selling the property to NorthPoint Development, LLC, a development company centered in Riverside, Missouri for a price of $24 million (about $79,000 per hectare or $32,000 per acre).  The company is trying to get Thurston County to change the zoning of the property to industrial.

The current proposal is to have a logistics center on West Rocky Prairie.  There would be six million square feet of warehouses (which is about 56 hectares or 138 acres).  There would be a massive increase in truck and freight train traffic, and numerous negative secondary environmental impacts.

References

Geography of Thurston County, Washington
Grasslands of the United States